V1472 Aquilae is a triple star system in the equatorial constellation of Aquila. It is a variable star that ranges in brightness from 6.36 down to 6.60. The system is located at a distance of approximately 780 light years from the Sun based on parallax. It is a high-velocity star system with a radial velocity of −112 km/s.

The binary nature of the main component was announced by P. B. Lucke and M. Mayor in 1982, who found it to be a single-lined spectroscopic binary with an orbital period of 198.7 days and an eccentricity of 0.05.  At the time of its discovery, it was the shortest known binary period of any class M giant.  The primary is an aging red giant with a stellar classification of M2.5III. It has a diameter  times and luminosity 1,100 times that of the Sun. The star is a fast rotator with a projected rotational velocity of 10 km/s, possibly due to interaction with its companion.

The variability of this star was discovered from Hipparcos data and, in 1997, it was classified as a semiregular variable with a period of 100.3727039 days. However, a plot of the light curve better matches that of an eclipsing binary or ellipsoidal variable.  The 198-day orbital period produces a light curve with a primary and secondary minimum which, together with possible variations due to ellipsoidal rotation, produces the observed semiregular 100-day photometric variation.  Later observations show that it is less luminous than expected for a pulsating star with its amplitude, being more typical of ellipsoidal variables, and that it has a 200.05-day period with primary and secondary minima.

References

Triple stars
M-type giants
Eclipsing binaries
Rotating ellipsoidal variables
Semiregular variable stars

Aquila (constellation)
Durchmusterung objects
190658
098954
Aquilae, V1472
7680